The National Center for Regenerative Medicine (NCRM) was founded in 2004 and specializes in regenerative medical research, while acting as the coordinating organization for other associated institutions.

Institution coordination
The NCRM acts as a coordinating organization for the following institutions:

Center for Stem Cell and Regenerative Medicine: developing basic and clinical research programs, biomedical and tissue engineering programs, and the development and administration of new therapies to patients
Armed Forces Institute of Regenerative Medicine: developing clinical therapies for military-related injuries

See also
 Stem cell laws

References

Stem cells
Healthcare in Cleveland